Scott Gregory Hookey (born 10 February 1967) was an Australian cricketer who played for the Tasmanian Tigers and the New South Wales Blues. He was a left-handed batsman, who played interstate cricket from 1987 until 1995. He was professional for Hyde CC in the Central Lancashire League in 1989. He was also Professional for Darwen CC in the northern league in 1988,1990,1991.

External links
 

1967 births
Living people
Tasmania cricketers
Australian cricketers
Cricketers from Sydney
New South Wales cricketers
M Parkinson's World XI cricketers